Văratic may refer to several places in Moldova:

Văratic, Ialoveni, a commune in Ialoveni district
Văratic, Rîşcani, a commune in Rîşcani district

See also
Văratec (disambiguation)